The 2011 FIA GT1 Sachsenring round is an auto racing event held at the Sachsenring, Saxony, Germany on 13–15 May, and will be the fourth round of the 2011 FIA GT1 World Championship season.  It is the FIA GT1 World Championship's first race held at the  Sachsenring, as the circuit replaces the Nürburgring as the German round for the series.  The event will be supported by the German ADAC Masters Weekend, featuring the ADAC GT Masters, ATS Formel 3 Cup, ADAC Formel Masters, and ADAC Procar Series, as well as the German Mini Challenge.

Background

Marc Basseng and Markus Winkelhock of Münnich Motorsport retained their championship lead following the Algarve round and further extended their advantage to twenty points over both Young Driver's Darren Turner and Stefan Mücke and Algarve Championship Race-winners Michael Krumm and Lucas Luhr of JR Motorsports. Luhr and Krumm have gained 35 kg, while Turner and Mücke carry only 20 kg into Sachsenring. Luhr and Krumm also have the addition of 15 kg which have been added to the minimum weight for all Nissans as part of the FIA's balance of performance. The Ford GT teams have also had their minimum weights altered, losing 10 kg. In the Teams' Championship Hexis AMR has taken over the title lead, a single point ahead of both Münnich and JR Motorsports, while Young Driver is two points further behind in fourth.

With only a week between the Algarve and Sachsenring, the majority of teams have retained the line-ups.  Frédéric Makowiecki returns to Marc VDS after being absent in the Algarve, while Yann Clairay moves from Marc VDS to Belgian Racing to replace Martin Matzke.  Warren Hughes rejoins the Sumo Power GT team he drove for in 2010, replacing Ricardo Zonta in the team's No. 20 car, partnering Enrique Bernoldi.  The sole DKR Engineering Corvette has withdrawn from the Sachsenring event due to a lack of spare parts after the team has suffered three accidents in past four races, reducing the field to seventeen cars.

Qualifying

Qualifying result
For qualifying, Driver 1 participates in the first and third sessions while Driver 2 participates in only the second session.  The fastest lap for each session is indicated with bold.

 The No. 11 Exim Bank Corvette had its Qualifying Session 3 times cancelled for stopping in the pit lane instead of returning to its garage during the session.
 The No. 5 Swiss Racing Lamborghini was penalized ten grid spots for overtaking during a red flag period in the Qualifying sessions.

Races

Qualifying Race
Following a penalty handed to the Corvette of Exim Bank Team China, the No. 37 Münnich Lamborghini of Nicky Pastorelli lead the field at the start, quickly getting a clear hold on first ahead of Clivio Piccione's Hexis Aston Martin.  Entering Turn 1, Antoine Leclerc's Belgian Racing Ford tipped the Marc VDS Ford into a spin.  Facing backwards, Marc Hennerici was then collected by the second Belgian car of Christoffer Nygaard.  With both cars unable to get moving again, the safety car was dispatched for a full course caution to gather the field at the end of the first lap.  The safety car was recalled at the start of Lap 4 and Pastorelli resumed his lead of the race.  A lap later Nicky Catsburg in the Exim Corvette started to make a pass for seventh place on the JR Motorsports Nissan of Michael Krumm in the first sequence of corners, but spun into the gravel after getting ahead of Krumm exiting Turn 3, stranding the car in the gravel trap.

After the restarting the race in 12th place, Marc VDS's Frédéric Makowiecki began to make his way through the field, passing five cars on track in the next ten laps.  As Makowiecki challenged Young Driver's Alex Müller for fifth place into Turn 3 the two made contact and Müller spun his car around, resuming at the back of the field, while Makowiecki continued to race on without being slowed by the incident.  At the front of the field, Piccini closed on the rear of Pastorelli and began to challenge for the race lead, followed closely by Darren Turner in third.  On Lap 18, the pit window opened and the top three all made their pit stops at the end of that lap.  Hexis made the quickest pit stop of the three, allowing Stef Dusseldorp to exit the pits first, followed by Young Driver's Stefan Mücke.  Münnich Motorsport suffered a problem with their tire challenge, slowing their pit stop and losing Dominik Schwager three positions as he returned to the track.  Enrique Bernoldi briefly held the race lead for Sumo Power for one lap before making his pit stop, handing the lead to Makowiecki.  Marc VDS brought the Ford into the pits as the last car to make a pit stop and Maxime Martin was able to exit in the race lead, but he was immediately challenged by Dusseldorp into Turn 1.  After Martin defended the race lead he was able to pull away from Dusseldorp, while Warren Hughes had taken over third place after the completion of all pit stops.

With twenty minutes remaining in the race, Max Nilsson went wide in Turn 9 and hit the safety barriers, retiring on the spot.  Yann Clairay of Belgian Racing attempted to challenge Markus Winkelhock for tenth place, but spun on his own in Turn 4 and fell to 12th.  In the closing five minutes of the race, Mücke caught Hughes to challenge for third place and passed for the position.  Further behind them, Christian Hohenadel and Schwager challenged Peter Dumbreck's Nissan for fifth position, but Schwager braked too late for Turn 1 while attempting to pass Dumbreck and went into the gravel trap, eventually falling to seventh.  Hohenadel then took over the challenge to Dumbreck and successfully passed him on the final lap of the race.  Martin cross the finish line 6.6 seconds ahead of Dusseldorp, followed by Hughes and Mücke, and finally Hohenadel and Dumbreck completed the final two positions for championship points.

Race result

Championship Race

Race result

References

External links
 Sachsenring GT1 Race in Germany – FIA GT1 World Championship

Sachsenring
FIA GT1